Dmitry Albertovych Tyapushkin (born 6 November 1964) is a Russian professional football coach and a former Russian-Ukrainian player who also represented Ukraine national football team.

Club career
Native of Russian Lower Volga region, Tyapushkin played for few Russian clubs out of Krasnoyarsk (including Yenisey) in the Soviet Union before 1988 moving to Ukraine where he played until 1994 in lower leagues and met the fall of the Soviet Union. Following the establishment of new Ukrainian national top division in 1992 Tyapushkin entered it with its FC Nyva Ternopil from the Soviet Second League.

He made his debut in the Russian Premier League in 1994 for FC Spartak Moscow. Since then his professional football career including as a player or a coach was associated only with Russia. In 2000 Tyapushkin retired from playing career and continued as a goalkeeping coach in FC Sokol Saratov.

His coaching career included such clubs like FC Sokol Saratov, PFC CSKA Moscow, FC MVD Rossii Moscow, FC Salyut Belgorod, FC Krylya Sovetov Samara, FC Mordovia Saransk, and FC SKA-Khabarovsk where he acted as a goalkeeping coach. During his stint in CSKA Moscow, Tyapushkin only dealt with the club's academy and junior squad.

Honours
 Russian Premier League champion: 1994.
 Russian Premier League bronze: 1995, 1997.
 Russian Cup finalist: 1999.

European club competitions
 1994–95 UEFA Champions League with FC Spartak Moscow: 6 games.
 1996–97 UEFA Cup with PFC CSKA Moscow: 1 game.
 1997 UEFA Intertoto Cup with FC Dynamo Moscow: 6 games.
 1998–99 UEFA Cup with FC Dynamo Moscow: 5 games.

International career
Playing in Ukraine since 1988 at international level Tyapushkin represented the newly formed official Ukraine national football team for which he recorded seven played games. He made his debut on 15 March 1994 in a game against Israel national football team.

Tyapushkin became the first main goalkeeper of Ukraine national football team in its first qualification cycle UEFA Euro 1996 in which he played the first 4 of 10 games with one game tied and three lost. Following a home loss to the Italy national football team, he was replaced with Oleh Suslov.

Tyapushkin replaced the first Ukrainian goalkeeping duet from Kharkiv Ihor Kutyepov and Oleksandr Pomazun who were the first international goalies for Ukraine.

References

1964 births
Living people
People from Volsk
Soviet footballers
Russian footballers
Ukrainian footballers
Association football goalkeepers
Naturalized citizens of Ukraine
Ukraine international footballers
FC Yenisey Krasnoyarsk players
FC Desna Chernihiv players
FC Nyva Ternopil players
FC Spartak Moscow players
PFC CSKA Moscow players
FC Dynamo Moscow players
FC Sokol Saratov players
Russian Premier League players
Ukrainian Premier League players
Russian football managers
Sportspeople from Saratov Oblast